Kitanemuk traditional narratives include myths, legends, tales, and oral histories preserved by the Kitanemuk people of the Tehachapi Mountains, southern Sierra Nevada, and the western Mojave Desert of southern California.

Limited information has been published on Kitanemuk oral literature. More is like to be forthcoming from the papers of John Peabody Harrington. Kitanemuk mythology seems to have shown influences from several of the group's neighbors, including the Kawaiisu, Chumash, and Yokuts. (See also Traditional narratives (Native California).)

References
 Kroeber, A. L. 1907. "Indian Myths of South Central California". University of California Publications in American Archaeology and Ethnology 4:167-250. Berkeley. (Kitanemuk myth, pp. 243-244.)
 Zigmond, Maurice. 1980. Kawaiisu Mythology: An Oral Tradition of South-Central California. Ballena Press Anthropological Papers No. 18. Menlo Park, California. (Two Kitanemuk myths collected from Marcelino Rivera and Isabella Gonzales in the late 1930s, pp. 213-218.)

External links

On-Line Examples of Kitanemuk Narratives
 "Indian Myths of South Central California" by Alfred L. Kroeber (1907)

Traditional narratives (Native California)
History of the Mojave Desert region
History of the Sierra Nevada (United States)